Minimbah is a closed station on the Main North railway line in New South Wales.  It opened in 1898 and was completely demolished after closure. Little trace remains.

References 

Disused regional railway stations in New South Wales
Railway stations in the Hunter Region
Main North railway line, New South Wales
Railway stations in Australia opened in 1898